Anders Hansson (born February 18, 1976), is a Swedish politician of the Moderate Party. He has been a member of the Riksdag since 2006. He is currently taking up seat number 12 in the Riksdag for the constituency of Skåne Southern.

Committee work and Politics
As a newly elected member of the Riksdag in 2006, Hansson became an alternate for the Justice committee and the Industry and Trade committee. During the spring of 2008, Hansson was even an alternate for the Joint Committee on Justice and Social Affairs. In the general election of 2010 Hansson left the Joint Committee on Justice and Social Affairs to become a member of the Defense Committee until the general election of 2014, when he left the Defense Committee to join the Justice Committee. In the recent 2018 general election Hansson left the Justice Committee to work in the Transport and Communications committee.

Ahead of the 2014 parliamentary election, Hansson made himself known as one of four parliamentary candidates for the Moderates who want to introduce a ban on begging.

In the budget vote in the spring of 2015, Hansson and party colleague Finn Bengtsson were the only moderates who opposed the party leadership's decision and voted in favor of the Alliance's budget proposal.

Hansson is also a member of municipal council for Vellinge Municipality. And is a board member for the property management company Vellingebostäder AB.

Personal life
He is married.

References

Members of the Riksdag from the Moderate Party
Members of the Riksdag 2006–2010
Living people
1976 births
Members of the Riksdag 2010–2014
Members of the Riksdag 2014–2018
21st-century Swedish politicians